Tumbbad is a 2018 Hindi-language period horror film directed by Rahi Anil Barve. Additionally, Anand Gandhi served as the creative director, and Adesh Prasad served as the co-director. Written by Mitesh Shah, Prasad, Barve, and Gandhi, the film was produced by Sohum Shah, Aanand L. Rai, Mukesh Shah and Amita Shah. Starring Sohum Shah in the lead role as Vinayak Rao, it follows the story of his search for a hidden treasure in the 20th century India village of Tumbbad, Maharashtra.

Barve began writing the script based on a story a friend had told him about in 1993, by Marathi writer Narayan Dharap. He wrote the first draft in 1997, when he was 18 years old. From 2009 to 2010, he created a 700-page storyboard for the film. It was optioned by seven production companies who backed out and went on the floor (went into production) three times. It was first shot in 2012 but after editing, Barve and Shah were not satisfied. The film was then re-written and re-shot with filming completed in May 2015. Pankaj Kumar served as the director of photography while Sanyukta Kaza was its editor. Jesper Kyd composed the original score while Ajay–Atul composed one song.

Tumbbad premiered in the critics' week section of the 75th Venice International Film Festival—the first Indian film to be screened there. It was also screened at: the 2018 Fantastic Fest, Sitges Film Festival, the Scream fest Horror Film Festival, the El Gouna Film Festival, 23rd International Film Festival of Kerala, Morbido Film Fest, Brooklyn Horror Film Festival and Nitte International Film Festival. It was released on 12 October 2018 to mostly positive reviews with critics praising the visuals. Tumbbad received eight nominations at the 64th Filmfare Awards winning three for Best Cinematography, Best Art Direction and Best Sound Design.

Plot 
In 1947, Vinayak Rao tells his 14-year-old son Pandurang about the Goddess of Prosperity. She is the symbol of unlimited gold (wealth) and grain (food) and the earth is her womb. When the universe was created, she gave birth to 160 million gods. Hastar, her first and most beloved offspring, was greedy for all her gold and food. Hastar managed to acquire the gold from the goddess but the other gods attacked him just as he was about to acquire her food. Then, the goddess saved him on the condition that he could never be worshipped and would be forgotten by history. For years, Hastar slumbered inside his mother's womb. However, the residents of Tumbbad, where Hastar has been trapped in his mother's womb, defy this ancient taboo and build a temple dedicated to Hastar. This earns the ire of the gods and they curse the village, causing an incessant downpour of rain over it.

In 1918, in Tumbbad, Vinayak's mother and the mistress of the local lord (addressed as Sarkar) meet him at his mansion. This includes offering him sexual services in the hope of acquiring a single gold coin kept with the Hastar idol. Meanwhile, at their home, Vinayak and his younger brother Sadashiv worry about having to feed the monstrous old woman, Sarkar's ancestor, chained up in a separate room. The Sarkar later dies, and the mother proposes leaving Tumbbad for Pune. Vinayak insists on finding the treasure that is rumoured to be hidden somewhere in the mansion. Sadashiv gets badly hurt after falling from a tree, forcing his mother to take him for help. She tells Vinayak he will have to feed his grandmother that night. She also warns him that if the old woman wakes up, he should invoke the name of "Hastar" to make her sleep. Meanwhile, Sadashiv dies on the way to the doctor.

The mother directs her carriage driver to Sarkar's mansion where she retrieves the gold coin. As Vinayak tries to feed her, the monstrous and hungry old woman attacks and shackles him to eat him. Vinayak invokes Hastar's name, causing her to fall into slumber. His mother returns, and the next day she and Vinayak leave Tumbbad for Pune. She forces Vinayak to promise never to return to Tumbbad, despite his protests to stay and search for the treasure.

Fifteen years pass and Vinayak grows up. Desperate to escape his life of poverty, Vinayak returns to Tumbbad. The old woman, with now a tree growing out of her body, warns him he will be cursed to become immortal and turned into a monster like her if he touches the treasure i.e. Hastar. She explains that a well leads to the goddess' womb where Hastar dwells, in exchange for ending her prolonged suffering. Vinayak keeps his promise and sets her on fire, thus killing her. Although Hastar stole the goddess's gold, he was unable to acquire her grain. Therefore, being hungry for years, he desires flour. Vinayak physically trains himself to climb up and down a long rope and makes dolls out of dough to lure Hastar inside the goddess's womb. While he is distracted by the food, Vinayak swipes at Hastar's loincloth containing the gold. Vinayak regularly repeats the procedure to steal dropped coins. He offers his first gold coin to the opium merchant Raghav to pay off a debt. Each time he needs more money, Vinayak returns to Tumbbad to steal from Hastar.

Raghav openly wonders about the treasure rumoured to exist in the Tumbbad mansion while also questioning why Vinayak can only retrieve a few coins at a time. Vinayak and his wife give birth to their son Pandurang. When Sergeant Cooper gives him only two days to come through with the money, Raghav sells his widowed daughter-in-law to Vinayak as a mistress, who tells Vinayak of Raghav's plans to visit Tumbbad to help himself to the treasure in exchange for money. Vinayak is then shown following Raghav to the Tumbbad mansion where he tricks him into descending into the goddess' womb where Hastar viciously attacks Raghav and turns him into a monster, conjoining him into the walls of the womb. Vinayak burns Raghav alive to end his suffering.

In 1947, Vinayak takes Pandurang to the mansion to train him for the same purpose and is told not to bring the dough doll down. But he secretly brings a dough doll and Hastar unexpectedly attacks. They barely manage to escape and Vinayak chides his son for nearly getting them touched. Pandurang suggests stealing Hastar's loincloth and they make dozens of dough dolls to distract Hastar. However, the two of them become trapped inside the womb when multiple clones of Hastar appear, one for each doll they possess. With no hope of escaping, Vinayak ties the dolls to his body to act as bait, to allow his son to return safely. Once the coast is clear, Pandurang climbs back to the surface to see his father being mutated into a monster outside the well. Vinayak presents him with the stolen loincloth that he stole from Hastar, but Pandurang refuses to take it. Sobbing at seeing what his father turned into, Pandurang reluctantly sets Vinayak on fire and leaves.

Cast 
 Sohum Shah as Vinayak Rao
 Jyoti Malshe as Vinayak's mother
 Dhundiraj Prabhakar Jogalekar as young Vinayak
 Rudra Soni as Sadashiv
 Madhav Hari Joshi as Sarkar
 Piyush Kaushik as Grandmother
 Anita Date-Kelkar as Vaidehi; Vinayak's wife
 Deepak Damle as Raghav
 Cameron Anderson as Sergeant Cooper
 Ronjini Chakraborty as Vinayak's mistress
 Mohammad Samad as Pandurang

Production

Development 
Director Rahi Anil Barve said the title is derived from Shripad Narayan Pendse's Marathi novel Tumbadche Khot. He wrote the first draft in 1997, when he was 18 years old. From 2009 to 2010, he created a 700-page storyboard within eight months, which he said was the "anchor on which everything was based." Barve wrote the script based on a story his friend had told when they were in the Nagzira wildlife sanctuary in 1993 "which made him crap his pants." It was a story by Marathi writer Narayan Dharap. Years later, when he revisited Dharap's story, he found it "utterly bland, mundane and forgettable." He realised "it was my friend's narration... that left an indelible print- no, scar on my psyche" which "kept the story alive." Barve took the story's basic premise about a scheming moneylender and another of his works, about a girl left alone with her grandmother who is possessed by a demon, and began writing a screenplay. He managed to find a producer, but they backed out in 2008. He obtained financing and principal photography began in the monsoon of 2012.

Sohum Shah was cast in the role of Vinayak Rao, for which he gained . Since the production took six years, he maintained his character's look for the entire period. Shah said that he was surprised after hearing the story for the time because he "hadn't seen anything like this in Indian cinema." He found it similar to Vikram Baital and Panchatantra. Barve said the story's main theme was greed, and that the first half hour of the film is in the "universe of Dharap's stories." The film shows Hastar who, according to mythology stated in the movie, was banished to the womb of the mother goddess for being greedy for food and gold. The film is divided in three chapters which Barve said was also a metaphor for the "journey of India, as we see it today." It had gone on the floor three times and was optioned by seven production companies who backed out. Barve feels this was because he had "no frame of reference for them, nothing like Tumbbad had even been tried before." Shah worked on his Marathi diction and accent since the character of Vinayak was a Marathi. Anand Gandhi served as the co-writer, creative director and executive producer. Barve's initial idea was to tell three different stories of Tumbbad village in the film; Gandhi and Mitesh turned it into one person's story. The myth of Hastar was the last addition to the story to serve as a backstory. The screenplay was written by Barve, Prasad, Gandhi and Mitesh Shah.

Filming and post-production 
Tumbbad first went into production in 2008 with Nawazuddin Siddiqui in the lead role but was quickly shelved as the producer backed out. It was then shot in 2012 after Shah and Gandhi came on board. The film has minimal dialogue and was shot with constant physical movement with few cuts. Barve said, "we shot in the rain at age-old locations, where no human had ventured for at least a hundred years. For me, Tumbbads locations, the feel of its stuffy air, and the lonely rainy atmosphere that defies the feeling of time's passage is as central as its characters." After the editing, Barve and Shah realised the film was "not able to achieve what it set out to do." It was then re-written and re-shot and the filming completed in May 2015. The Mutha River in the Onkareshwar area was taken as a reference for the set creation. In three weeks, the set of the small town around the temple was recreated. A doppelganger set of an old Pune city was created for the film. Sohum Shah wore the typical attire worn by Konkanasth Brahmans in Maharashtra. It was shot in natural light. Some scenes were also shot in Mahabaleshwar and the Tumbbad village. The visual effects were produced by Sean Wheelan's team at Filmgate Films, who were also the co-producers. Pankaj Kumar served as the director of photography and Sanyukta Kaza edited the film. Kumar had shot Barve's short film Manjha in 2006 and learned of Tumbbads story from Barve.

Barve created a story book for reference. Kumar called the filming process "long, strong and intense." It was decided the film's look would be "moody and gloomy"; the village had to look timeless "without a clear demarcation between day and night." The shooting was done without any sunlight on Red Camera in digital format. Kumar said that the film's entire shooting schedule revolved around lighting, noting the constant rain and grey tone gave a "constant sense of gloom and dread." He wanted the film to be shot only during the monsoon with its constant rain as he wanted a feeling of "wetness at all times": "We wanted the audience to feel drenched when they came out of the theatres." However, due to a shortage of rainfall that year, Kumar did not get sufficient rain. The crew used artificial rain for the scenes and had to wait for hours for cloud cover. Tumbbad was shot in several locations across Maharashtra including Saswad and villages of the Satara district. Some scenes were shot on constructed sets in Mumbai, including the womb sequence. Kumar said that the team did extensive recce for a few years as they were looking for "large landscapes without modern infringements, without towers and structures." They also did not have the budget for the visual effects to erase the contemporary architectural elements.

The film had four colour schemes including blue, cold grey, red and gold. 50 lanterns and lamps were used for several scenes to avoid modern-day lighting techniques since it was a period film. The scenes inside the womb took 15 to 20 days to shoot without any visual effects. The character of Hastar was created with heavy prosthetic makeup that required six to seven hours to prepare. Shah wore contact lenses throughout the film for the grey eyes. The entire film was shot over 100 to 120 days with four shooting schedules in 2012 and 2015. After the shoot, the team felt that the film was "halfway there" to becoming something that "audiences hadn't seen before." After that the script went through re-writing, some scenes were added, and the story was "enhanced". The sets were rebuilt and the womb was added. The film's production designers were Nitin Zihani Choudhary and Rakesh Yadav. For their research, they used photograph's from the 18th and 19th century during the British Raj. The interiors of the cave were shot at the Purandare Wada near Pune. It was made to look old and "consumed by earth"; the crew spread moss all over the site. An entire market was created at Satara that included several shops, but it was not used very often in the film.

The film's post-production took two-and-a-half years to complete. Kaza had asked Prasad to write the dialogues again after she re-arranged the grandmother's tree scene while editing it. She used the "only usable stable shots and put them in a certain order and then called Adesh and asked him to re-write the dialogues according to the edit." Its initial runtime was close to 200 minutes which was edited to 100 minutes. The film's climax inside the womb was shot with only one source of light—an oil lamp. The film was produced by Film i Väst and Filmgate Films along with Eros International and Aanand L. Rai's Colour Yellow Productions.

Music 
Tumbbads title track  was composed, arranged and produced by Ajay–Atul; it was sung in Hindi with lyrics written by Raj Shekhar. It was released on 6 October 2018. The original score was composed by Jesper Kyd. Prasad was sampling music pieces from several composers when he heard the soundtrack "Apocalypse" from the 2006 video game Hitman: Blood Money composed by Kyd and decided to work with him. Kyd felt the Tumbbad team wanted the soundtrack to be between a western and an Indian sound.

Prasad sent Kyd a sample of Laxmikant–Pyarelal's track from Ram Lakhan (1989) for reference; Kyd also watched videos of street drummers and The Sinful Dwarf (1973). Kyd recorded the choir with Bulgarian music called "Descending" which was the first track he wrote for the film. Both Prasad and Kyd used to interact with each other through Skype. The score involved live recording with cello and violin as well as the real sound of crickets. Kyd made three different types of sound for the film's three parts. The album consists of 22 tracks and was released on 10 November 2018.

Release 
Tumbbad premiered in the critics' week section of the 75th Venice International Film Festival, becoming the first Indian film to be screened there. It was also screened at: the 2018 Fantastic Fest, Sitges Film Festival, the Screamfest Horror Film Festival, the El Gouna Film Festival, 23rd International Film Festival of Kerala, Morbido Film Fest, Brooklyn Horror Film Festival and Nitte International Film Festival. Before the film's release, a special screening was held by Aanand L. Rai which was attended by the film's team and several other filmmakers. Tumbbad was released in India on 12 October 2018 on 575 screens. It is also available on Amazon Prime Video in Hindi, Tamil and Telugu language.

Reception

Critical reception

India 
Tumbbad opened to mostly positive critical reviews. On the review aggregator website Rotten Tomatoes, it holds an approval rating of 87% based on 23 reviews, with an average rating of 7.67/10.
Rachit Gupta of The Times of India called the film "moody and atmospheric" and said that fans of Hollywood horror films will be reminded of Pan's Labyrinth (2006) and Eraserhead (1977). Baradwaj Rangan wrote: "It’s been a while since something genre-based turned out so rich and mysterious, so defiantly its own thing." Raja Sen called the film "an ambitious one, artistic and attentively made, reminding me of the trippy stylings of filmmaker Tarsem Singh." The Indian Expresss Shubhra Gupta called it "highly unusual, visually stunning, richly atmospheric concoction of genres and themes."

Sanjukta Sharma of Scroll.in felt the film subverts genres "astutely, without any gimmicks": "It has been a while since a horror film spoke so eloquently about something as primal as greed and remained true to its Indian setting." Mints  Udita Jhunjhunwala cited the film as "eerie, imaginatively designed, stunningly filmed and well directed." Anupama Chopra felt the film was nothing like "you have seen before in Hindi cinema", calling it "the most visually stunning film I've seen since Padmaavat". Subhash K. Jha praised the visuals and wrote: "If you think cinema is predominantly a visual medium then don't miss Tumbbad". Rediff.com's Sreehari Nair observed that "our apprehensions are raised lazily and we wait like masochists for the manipulations to arrive, but what we get instead is a single-line moral." Namrata Joshi gave a positive review and wrote: "The atmosphere, landscape, and themes in Tumbbad are accentuated by a sense of Gothic dread and an eerie expectancy of the diabolical."

Suparna Sharma of the Deccan Chronicle noted that the film has "the beauty and horror of imagination, and it stalks you gently, long after you’ve left the theatre." Reuters' Shilpa Jamkhandikar  said that the "true star here is Barve, who takes what could have been a regular horror film and elevates it to another level." Stutee Ghosh of The Quint wrote: "It excels is in its ability to weave together a formidable canvas with fear, fantasy and folklore blending in seamlessly to give us an unrelenting ominous journey." Anna M. M. Vetticad wrote: "The joy of watching Tumbbad comes from the fact that Barve and his co-writers offer no answers, making this a delightfully intriguing film." Rajeev Masand called it "a wildly original film with a look and feel that is of the highest standard." Jai Arjun Singh called the film "spooky, majestic and affecting, and these qualities come from the set design, the use of music, and the evocation of a place that is like a breathing thing, corroding the thoughts and actions of the people in it."

Overseas
Lee Marshall of Screen International called it an "initially atmospheric yarn let down by weak stock characters and a long veer into fright-free period drama in its over-long middle section". The Hollywood Reporters  Deborah Young called the film "atmospheric, heavy on mythology and scary as hell." J. Hurtado of Screen Anarchy had a positive response and wrote: "A slow burn whose finale is wonderfully unexpected and yet fitting, Tumbbad is a great film and hopefully the start of a new trend in India." He also included it on his list of 14 Favorite Indian Films of 2018.

Dread Central's Jonathan Barkan wrote that the film "is more focused on the horror of human behavior than it is on creaking doors and the terror of what lurks in the dark." He also felt that the film's second half was "overly drawn out". Matt Donato of /Film wrote: "Mad creature-feature designs, Academy-worthy blends of color and pristine optical packaging, despicable character work meant to provoke heartlessness traded for materialistic grandiosity – Tumbbad is a full genre package seasoned with a pungent foreign kick."  Trace Thurman of Bloody Disgusting wrote in his review: "With a compelling story of greed that spans more than 30 years, a memorable monster and some truly beautiful cinematography, Tumbbad is not to be missed." Jacob Trussell of Film School Rejects called the film "Indian folk horror at its finest" that offers "an Indian film about Indian culture, removed of the trappings of the musical and replaced with stories of little known Indian theology."

Box office 
It collected  in its opening day at the box office.

Accolades

Sequel
In November 2018, it was announced that Sohum Shah is working on the film's sequel. It will take place in the Tumbbad village and will feature Hastar.

References

External links 
 
 

2018 films
2018 horror films
2010s historical horror films
Indian historical horror films
Swedish horror films
2010s Hindi-language films
Films set in country houses
Films set in the British Raj
Films set in Maharashtra
Films shot in Maharashtra